Funke Adesiyan  is a Nigerian film actress, politician and personal assistant on domestic and social events to Aisha Buhari, Nigeria’s First Lady.

Early life and education
Adesiyan hails from Ibadan, Oyo State. She attended Time and Tide International School, Ibadan City academy, Saint Anne's School, and Oriwu College Ikorodu for both her elementary and post-elementary school. She holds both a bachelor's degree in Performing Arts and a Diploma in Law from Olabisi Onabanjo University. Adesiyan studied filmmaking and directing at the New York Film Academy.

Career

Acting
Adesiyan started acting professionally in 2003.

Politics
In 2011, Funke Adesiyan joined active politics when she became the southwest coordinator for Ibrahim Shekarau's presidential campaign. In 2014, she became the second entertainer to win a primary election, after Desmond Elliot.
She contested but lost in the 2015 Oyo State House of Assembly election under the People's Democratic Party.

In 2019, Adesiyan was appointed as the personal assistant on domestic and social events to Aisha Buhari.

Filmography
Eti Keta
Obinrin Ale
Ayoku Leyin
Aparo
Kakaaki

Awards and nomination

References

External links

Living people
Yoruba actresses
Actresses in Yoruba cinema
People from Oyo State
New York Film Academy alumni
Olabisi Onabanjo University alumni
All Progressives Congress politicians
Yoruba politicians
Nigerian film actresses
Nigerian politicians
Nigerian women in politics
Nigerian film producers
Nigerian media executives
Year of birth missing (living people)